Chillán conurbation or Gran Chillán (Greater Chillan) is a Chilean conurbation formatted for the communes of Chillán and Chillán Viejo in Diguillin Province in Ñuble Region.

References 

Populated places in Diguillín Province
Metropolitan areas of Chile